The long-tail dragonet (Callionymus neptunius) is a species of dragonet native to the Pacific waters around Papua New Guinea, Indonesia and the Philippines where it occurs at depths of from .  Males of this species grows to a length of  TL while the females are smaller.

References 

N
Fish described in 1910